Certified Crunk is a compilation album by American Southern hip hop group Lil' Jon & the East Side Boyz. It was released on November 4, 2003 via Mirror Image Entertainment/Ichiban Records. Production was handled by Midnight Black, Kool-Ace, Mr. Collipark and Lil' Jon. It features guest appearances from Jazze Pha, 404 Soldierz, Darryl E., DJ Pryme, Hitman Sammy Sam, Killer Mike, Ludacris, No Surrender, Playa Poncho, Ying Yang Twins, Organized Noize and Jermaine Dupri. The album peaked at number 197 on the Billboard 200, number 40 on the Top R&B/Hip-Hop Albums and number nine on the Independent Albums in the United States.

Track listing

Charts

References

External links

Ichiban Records albums
2003 compilation albums
Albums produced by Lil Jon
Albums produced by Mr. Collipark
Lil Jon & the East Side Boyz albums